Omagh United was a Northern Irish intermediate-level football club. The club was formed in 2007 with the aim of returning senior to Omagh, County Tyrone, following the demise of Omagh Town F.C. in 2005. The club started out as a junior team in the Fermanagh & Western League, before gaining entry to the intermediate section of the Mid-Ulster Football League the following season. Promotion to the Intermediate A Division was achieved immediately, but after only three years in existence, the club folded at the end of the 2009–10 season for financial reasons. It was managed for most of its brief history by former Omagh Town manager Roy McCreadie.

References
"Clubs united by failure", "The Park", pp. 6–7, Belfast Telegraph, 23 August 2010

External links
 Omagh United Official Club website

Association football clubs established in 2007
Association football clubs in County Tyrone
Association football clubs disestablished in 2010
Defunct association football clubs in Northern Ireland
Omagh
2007 establishments in Northern Ireland
2010 disestablishments in Northern Ireland